As part of the 2000 Hong Kong legislative election, held 10 September, all 5 seats in Hong Kong Island were contested. The Democratic Party and Democratic Alliance for the Betterment of Hong Kong (DAB) each took two seats, with Choy So-yuk taking the last seat with the largest remainder method. Cyd Ho of The Frontier who ran for the New Territories last election ran in Hong Kong Island and replaced Christine Loh of the Citizens Party who did not seek for re-election.

DAB's  Cheng Kai-nam soon gave up his seat over a corruption scandal and an independent barrister supported by the pro-democracy camp Audrey Eu was elected in the December by-election.

Overall results
Before election:

Change in composition:

Candidates list

See also
Legislative Council of Hong Kong
Hong Kong legislative elections
2000 Hong Kong legislative election

References

2000 Hong Kong legislative election